Lee Cummard (born March 31, 1985) is a former American college basketball player and current BYU basketball assistant coach. Lee Cummard was a standout guard at Brigham Young University from 2005 to 2009, appearing in all 131 games BYU played during his four seasons in Provo. Cummard went undrafted in the 2009 NBA Draft and after a brief stint with the NBA D-League played professional overseas in France, Japan and Belgium. From 2012–2016 season, he was a starter for the Okapi Aalstar in Belgium, helping his club to the Belgium Cup semifinals four times and finishing as runner-up in 2013. In 2016 he joined the coaching staff at BYU as a graduate assistant. In 2018, he was hired as an assistant coach at BYU.

Early life
Cummard was born in Mesa, Arizona
and attended high school at Mesa High School, where he played high school basketball. There, he was named the 2004 Arizona Player of the Year and a McDonald's All-America nominee. He led his team to the 5A State Championship, averaging 20.0 points, 5.5 rebounds and 3.5 assists as a senior in 2003–04.

College career
In his freshman year at BYU, he started 14 games, averaging 4.9 points while shooting .455 from the floor, .395 on threes and .765 from the line in 14.8 minutes overall for the Cougars. He also went 2-for-3 from three-point range against TCU to record 6 points while adding 4 rebounds and tying his career high with 4 assists in 19 minutes that season.

In his sophomore year, Cummard started all 34 contests and averaging 9.4 points per game. He also led BYU in rebounds eight times, assists eight times and scoring twice, helping the Cougars claim the outright MWC title and a 25–9 overall record.

In his junior season, he led BYU in rebounds, assists, and scoring, helping the team claim the outright MWC title and a 25–9 overall record.

In his senior season, Cummard earned first-team All-MWC honors and was named a fourth-team All-American by FOXSports.com. He received High-Major All-America Second Team honors from CollegeHoops.net. That season, he received the Male Athlete of the Year Award and the Dale McCann Spirit of Sport Award at the 2009 Y Awards. That same season, Cummard was named to Wooden Award and Naismith Award preseason watch lists led the team in scoring, blocked shots, free throw percentage and three-point percentage was second on the team in field goal percentage, assists, and rebounding.

His name is found throughout the BYU record book as Cummard is top-20 all-time in program history in scoring, field goals made, field goal percentage, 3-point field goals made, 3-point field goal percentage, free-throw percentage, rebounds, assists, blocks and steals.

Cummard never missed a game as a player, appearing in all 131 games BYU played during his four seasons in Provo. He earned a starting spot midway through his freshman season and was in the starting five in 116 straight games.

Professional career
Cummard started the 2009–2010 season playing for Utah Flash in the D-League. Cummard played for the Sacramento Kings in the NBA Summer League in 2010.

In January 2010 he signed with the Fos Ouest Provence Basket in France, with whom he played the remainder of the season. From 2012–2016, he playing for Okapi Aalstar in Belgium where he helped the club finish second in the regular season standings twice in four years. Okapi Aalstar made it to the league semifinals all four years Cummard was on the team, finishing as Belgian Cup runner-up in 2013.

In 2016, Cummard joined the coaching staff at Brigham Young University as a graduate assistant.

On April 25, 2018 he was hired by BYU head coach Dave Rose as an assistant coach, filling a vacancy left by Heath Schroyer.

See also
 List of basketball clubs in France

References

External links
French League profile
Draft Express Profile

Eurobasket: Lee Cummard basketball profile

1985 births
Living people
American expatriate basketball people in Belgium
American expatriate basketball people in France
American expatriate basketball people in Japan
American men's basketball players
Basketball coaches from Arizona
Basketball players from Arizona
BYU Cougars men's basketball players
Fos Provence Basket players
Kyoto Hannaryz players
Mesa High School alumni
Okapi Aalstar players
Shooting guards
Small forwards
Sportspeople from Mesa, Arizona
Utah Flash players